Horse Ridge is series of volcanic ridges in eastern Deschutes County, Oregon, United States. It is located south of Highway 20, west of the Millican community, and south of the Oregon Badlands Wilderness. The Horse Ridge Research Natural Area occupies predominantly north and northeast facing slopes of the ridges. It was established in 1967. The Brothers Fault Zone bisects the ridges and exposed mafic lava rock has been dated to 7.5 ma.

References 

Landforms of Deschutes County, Oregon
Mountains of Oregon
National Natural Landmarks in Oregon
Ridges of Oregon
Volcanoes of Deschutes County, Oregon
Volcanoes of Oregon